Groom of the Chamber was a position in the Household of the monarch in early modern England. Other Ancien Régime royal establishments in Europe had comparable officers, often with similar titles. In France, the Duchy of Burgundy, and in England while French was still the language of the court, the title was varlet or valet de chambre.  In German,  Danish and Russian the term was "Kammerjunker" and in Swedish the similar "Kammarjunkare".

In England after the Restoration, appointments in the King's Household included Groom of the Great Chamber, Groom of the Privy Chamber and Groom of the Bedchamber. The first two positions were appointed by Lord Chamberlain's warrant; the third, of greater importance, was a Crown appointment.

Medieval and early-modern England
Traditionally, the English Court was organized into three branches or departments:
 the Household, primarily concerned with fiscal more than domestic matters, the "royal purse;"
 the Chamber, concerned with the Presence Chamber, the Privy chamber, and other more public rooms of the royal palaces, as the Bedchamber was concerned with the innermost;
 the Bedchamber, focused on the most direct and intimate aspects of the lives of the royal family, with its own offices, like the Groom of the Body and the Squire of the Body.

The Chamber organization was controlled by the Lord Chamberlain; if he was the general of a small army of servitors, the Grooms of the Chamber were his junior officers, with ushers and footmen the footsoldiers. The Grooms wore the royal livery (in earlier periods), served as general attendants, and fulfilled a wide range of specific functions. (One Groom of the Chamber had the job of handing the "King's Stuff" to a Squire of the Body, who would then dress the King.) Grooms ranked below Gentlemen of the Chamber, usually important noblemen, but above Yeomen of the Chamber.  They were mostly well-born, on a first rung of a courtier's career. The office of Groom of the Chamber could also be bestowed in a more honorific manner, upon people who served the royal household in some less direct way; the early Tudor poet Stephen Hawes became a Groom of the Chamber in 1502, under Henry VII.

Under James I, the Bedchamber was established as a semi-autonomous department (overseen by the Groom of the Stole) with its own hierarchy of Gentlemen, Grooms and Yeomen, which usurped those of the Privy Chamber in terms of their influence with and closeness to the King. (The old Bedchamber office of Esquire to the Body was finally abolished in 1702).

Grooms Extraordinary
In the reigns of the early monarchs of the House of Stuart, James I and Charles I, the actors of the King's Men, the playing company under royal patronage, were officially "Grooms extraordinary of the Chamber".  They did not usually fulfill the normal functions of the office; rather, they served the King by performing plays for him.  Although on busy occasions, the King's Men appear to have acted as more ordinary servants: in August 1604 they were "waiting and attending" upon the Spanish ambassador at Somerset House, "on his Majesty's service" — but no plays were performed.)  They were also turned out to bulk up the Household for grand ceremonial occasions. A similar arrangement held for some of Queen Anne's Men, including their playwright Thomas Heywood; they became Grooms of the Queen's Chamber, under the Queen's Chamberlain. On some occasions, Shakespeare, Heywood, and their compatriots wore the royal livery, marched in processions, and played other roles in the ceremonial life of the monarchy. (Grooms could not be arrested for debt without the permission of the Lord Chamberlain — a big advantage for sometimes-struggling actors.) In at least two cases, those of George Bryan (Lord Chamberlain's Men) and John Singer (Queen Elizabeth's Men; Admiral's Men), professional actors became "normal" Grooms of the Chamber, with the normal duties, after retiring from the stage.

List of Grooms of the Chamber
Stephen Hawes, 1502–?
William Sharington, 1542–1544
George Bridgeman or Brediman, c.1553-1580 

Elizabeth I (1558–1603)
Thomas Astley, 1558-1595
John Baptist Castilion, 1558-1597
Thomas Commander, 1558-1559
Henry Seckford, 1558-1610
Thomas Lichfield, 1559-1586
John Tamworth, 1559–1569 
Edward Cary, 1562-1618
Henry Middlemore, 1566-1593
Thomas Knyvett, 1570-1622
Thomas Gorges, 1571-1610
William Killigrew, 1578-1622
Edward Darcy, 1579-1612
Edward Denny, 1582-1600
Michael Stanhope, c.1583–1603 
Ferdinando Richardson (alias Heyborne), 1586-1618

James I (1603–1625) Sir John Holles, 1603–1610 
 Sir Henry Bromley, 1603–>1609 
 Humphrey May, 1604–1611 
 Sir Thomas Gerard, 1st Baronet, 1603–1621 
 William Woodhouse, 1603–1625 
 Henry Goodyer, 1603–1626 
 Sir Oliver Cromwell, 1603–1636 
 Sir Robert Mansell, by 1604–>1615 
 Sir Walter Cope, by 1607–1614 
 Sir John Kay, by 1608–>1615 
 Sir William Uvedale, by 1612–>1618 
 Sir John Eyre, by 1612–>1632
 George Chaworth, 1st Viscount Chaworth, 1621–? 
 John Maynard, by 1621–>1641 Queen Anne of Denmark Samuel Daniel
 John Florio , by 1604 - 1619Public Record Office, S.P. 14.107, f.93 (Cal. S.P. Dom.1619-23, p.31)
 Matthew HairstanesCharles I (1625–1649) John Trevor, 1625–?  (died 1630)
 Sir William Walter, 1633–1646 

List of Grooms of the BedchamberJames I (1603–1625)
 John Murray, (1603-1622)Charles I (1625–1649) George Kirke, 1625–1646
 William Murray, 1625->1643
 William Legge, 1645–1647 Commonwealth (1649–1660)No Grooms of the Bedchamber appointed

Post-Restoration England and Great Britain
Fourteen Grooms of the Great Chamber were appointed under Charles II (later reduced to ten); they served as internal court messengers and were in attendance in the guard room.

The Grooms of the Privy Chamber were six in number (reduced to two under James I); initially responsible for manning the doors to the Privy Chamber, by 1720 the office largely lost its function, but attendance was still required for Coronations and other 'extraordinary Occasions'.

There were usually a dozen or so Grooms of the Bedchamber appointed (though under different monarchs the number varied from as many as fifteen or as few as eight), two of whom were on duty at any one time. They served for a week at a time in rotation and were responsible for attending the King in the Chamber when he dressed, and at Dinner when he dined privately (taking food and wine from the servants to give it to the Lords, who would serve The King). They would also deputise for the Lords of the Bedchamber if required to do so. Grooms of the Bedchamber were close to the King and were occasionally sent overseas as special envoys to negotiate royal marriages and such. During the exile of James II a court was maintained by that king in France and certain of his grooms joined him there. Similarly, during the last years of the reign of King George III, when he withdrew from public life in consequence of his poor mental health, several of his grooms followed him to Windsor Castle, whilst others remained in London to serve the Prince Regent, later to become King George IV. When the Monarch was a Queen, the positions of Groom of the Bedchamber were not filled (though Prince Albert, consort to Queen Victoria, did appoint his own Grooms of the Bedchamber).

List of Grooms of the Privy ChamberCharles II (1660–1685)James II 1685–1688William III 1689–17021702–1901List of Grooms of the BedchamberCharles II (1660–1685)James II (1685–1688)William III (1689–1702)Anne (1702–1714)No Grooms of the Bedchamber appointedGeorge I (1714–1727)George II (1727–1760)George III (1760–1820)George IV (1820–1830)William IV (1830–1837)Victoria (1837–1901)No Grooms of the Bedchamber appointedEdward VII (1901–1910)The term "Groom-in-Waiting" was employedGeorge V (1910–1936)The above-mentioned were gazetted as "Grooms of the Bedchamber in Waiting"; subsequently, the term "Groom in Waiting in Ordinary" was used.Edward VIII (1936)The term "Groom-in-Waiting" was employed.George VI (1936–1952)The term "Groom-in-Waiting" was employed.Elizabeth (1952–)'No Grooms of the Bedchamber appointed.In France
The French portrait painter Jean Clouet (c. 1485–1540) was appointed a valet de chambre groom of the chamber of the French monarchy in 1523, as was his son François Clouet later. The office could serve as a sinecure to provide a minimum income and social place for someone who enjoyed royal favor.

Many noble households in Europe had their own grooms of the chamber, known by various titles.  See Valet de chambre for a fuller account.

See also
 Groom of the Robes
 Groom of the Stool
 Gentleman of the Bedchamber

Notes

References
Bucholz, R. O. The Database of Court Officers 1660-1837. Loyola University of Chicago.
Brown, Cedric C., ed. Patronage, Politics, and Literary Traditions in England, 1558-1658. Detroit, Wayne State University Press, 1993.
Halliday, F. E. A Shakespeare Companion 1564–1964. Baltimore, Penguin, 1964.
Walter, James. Shakespeare's True Life.'' London, Longmans, Green & Co., 1890; reprinted Kessinger Publishing, 2003.

External links
 Groom of the Chamber

Positions within the British Royal Household